Cenaida Cebastiana Uribe Medina (born December 2, 1965 in Lima) is a Peruvian former volleyball player and politician (PNP). During her sports career, she played for the national team for many years and earned a silver medal at the 1988 Summer Olympics. Since 1996, she has held a trainer's licence.

Her first contact with politics was in 1981, when the Peruvian Ministry of Education won her as a promoter and coordinator of the sport of volleyball, a position she has not abandoned ever since. In 2005, she became an advisor to the parliamentary group in Congress. In 2006, she ran for Congresswoman on the list of the Union for Peru, which also promoted the candidates of her Peruvian Nationalist Party. She was elected, representing the constituency of Lima for the 2006–2011 term. She was reelected for the 2011–2016 term, this time on the successful Nationalist-dominated Peru Wins list.

External links

 Official Congressional Site
 
 

1965 births
Living people
Sportspeople from Lima
Peruvian women's volleyball players
Volleyball players at the 1988 Summer Olympics
Olympic volleyball players of Peru
Olympic silver medalists for Peru
Peruvian Nationalist Party politicians
Members of the Congress of the Republic of Peru
Peruvian sportsperson-politicians
Olympic medalists in volleyball
Medalists at the 1988 Summer Olympics
21st-century Peruvian politicians
21st-century Peruvian women politicians
Pan American Games medalists in volleyball
Pan American Games silver medalists for Peru
Volleyball players at the 1987 Pan American Games
Medalists at the 1987 Pan American Games
20th-century Peruvian women
Women members of the Congress of the Republic of Peru